Galatasaray SK. Men's 1988–1989 season is the 1988–89 volleyball season for Turkish professional basketball club Galatasaray Yurtiçi Kargo.

The club competes in:
Turkish Men's Volleyball League
CEV Champions Cup

Team Roster Season 1988–1989

Results, schedules and standings

Results

Pts=Points, Pld=Matches played, W=Matches won, L=Matches lost, F=Sets for, A=Sets against

Turkish Volleyball League 1988–89

Regular season

First half

Second half

Playoffs

Qualification Group A

FINAL group
Results

Pts=Points, Pld=Matches played, W=Matches won, L=Matches lost, F=Sets for, A=Sets against

Turkish Cup 1988

CEV European Champions Cup 1989

TSYD Cup 1988

References

Galatasaray S.K. (men's volleyball) seasons
Galatasaray Sports Club 1988–89 season